Spring Lake, originally named Edmonton Beach, is a village in central Alberta, Canada. It was known as the Summer Village of Edmonton Beach from 1959 to 1999.

Demographics 

In the 2016 Census of Population conducted by Statistics Canada, the Village of Spring Lake recorded a population of 699 living in 261 of its 303 total private dwellings, a  change from its 2011 population of 533.

The Village of Spring Lake's 2012 municipal census counted a population of 614, a 3.7% increase over its 2007 municipal census population of 592.

Services 
There is a large RV park on the east side of the lake, which has a small camping store which sells candy, newspapers, and a variety of camping items. Other than this there are no commercial businesses in the village.

See also 
List of communities in Alberta
List of villages in Alberta

References

External links 

1959 establishments in Alberta
Edmonton Metropolitan Region
Villages in Alberta